Oxford University Boat Club (OUBC) is the rowing club for male, heavyweight oarsman of the University of Oxford, England, located on the River Thames at Oxford. The club was founded in the early 19th century.

The Boat Race
The club races against the Cambridge University Boat Club in The Boat Race on the Thames in London each year, with the Oxford boat based at the Westminster School Boat Club. The club also selects a reserve crew, Isis, to race the Cambridge reserve crew, Goldie, earlier on Boat Race day.

OUBC was one of five clubs which retained the right until 2012 to appoint representatives to the Council of British Rowing.  The others were Leander Club, London Rowing Club, Thames Rowing Club and Cambridge University Boat Club.

College boat clubs

Facilities 
OUBC's boat house on the Isis (as the Thames is known at Oxford) burnt down in 1999 and much archival material, including photographs, was lost. OUBC now rows from its new purpose-built boat house in Wallingford, south of Oxford, following a successful fundraising appeal from 2004 to 2007. The boathouse was designed following a limited competition by Tuke Manton Architects LLP. The club has the use of the Redgrave Pinsent Rowing Lake in south Oxfordshire for training purposes, along with the GB Rowing squad and University College Oxford Boat Club.

Honours

British champions

Key = 2, 4, 8 (crew size), x (sculls), - (coxless), + (coxed)

Henley Royal Regatta

See also
List of Oxford University Boat Race crews
Rowing on the River Thames
University rowing (UK)

References

External links
OUBC website

History of rowing
Boat Club
 
The Boat Race
Sports clubs established in 1829
1829 establishments in England
University and college rowing clubs in the United Kingdom
Rowing clubs in Oxfordshire